The Security Council of the United Nations (UNSC) has adopted 21 resolutions concerning North Korea. Five resolutions were adopted during the Korean War in the 1950s.

In 1991, a single resolution was adopted regarding North Korea's accession to membership in the UN. Since then, many resolutions have been adopted in relation to the North Korean missile and nuclear program.

Background
 The UN Security Council toughens the sanctions in response to North Korea's nuclear and missile tests.
 The sanctions on North Korea are mainly economic in nature, regulating North Korea's economic activities such as trade with China. The resolutions' sanction mainly 'demands North Korea refrain from further nuclear or missile tests and return to the NPT'. Moreover, the sanctions resolutions try to ban North Korea's ability of exporting their natural resources such as coal and iron ore, and prohibit member states' exports to North Korea, actions which may contribute to North Korea's further nuclear and missile tests.

 The UN Security Council tries to urge North Korea for denuclearization, a measure that has proven to be ineffective in preventing further nuclear and missile tests.

 Meanwhile, the most severe sanction of the UNSC is found to be a ban on crude oil exports to North Korea, but such sanction has not been executed yet. The first step for such sanctions to proceed is the achievement of a consensus between member states and international society.

List

See also

China–North Korea relations
Foreign relations of North Korea
Human rights in North Korea
Korea and the United Nations
North Korea and weapons of mass destruction
Report of the Commission of Inquiry on Human Rights in the Democratic People's Republic of Korea
United Nations General Assembly resolutions – including those related to the Korean War
United Nations General Assembly Resolution 62/167
United Nations Security Council Resolution 88 – concerning the Republic of China during the Korean War

References

External links
 UN Security Council Resolutions on North Korea at Arms Control Association
 United Nations Documents for DPRK (North Korea) at Security Council Report
 UN Security Council Committee Established Pursuant to Resolution 1718 (2006) (Reports issued by the UN Panel of Experts, established to support of the Sanctions Committee in carrying out its mandate as specified in paragraph 12 of resolution 1718)
 Nuclear weapons at United Nations Office for Disarmament Affairs

 
United Nations
North Korea